Saint-Yan is a commune in the Saône-et-Loire department in the region of Bourgogne-Franche-Comté in eastern France.

Geography
The Arconce forms part of the commune's southern border and the Loire part of its western border.

Climate

Education
A campus of the École nationale de l'aviation civile (French civil aviation university) is located in Saint-Yan.

See also
Communes of the Saône-et-Loire department

References

Communes of Saône-et-Loire